Russia was a member of the Council of Europe, an international organization that focuses on the promotion of democracy and human rights, from 1996 to 2022. At the time of its accession, Russia did not meet the requirements of membership, but it was believed that joining would help Russia improve its record on democracy and human rights protection. In a 2019 paper published in the International & Comparative Law Quarterly, international law scholars Kanstantsin Dzehtsiarou and Donal K Coffey described Russia as showing "persistent and clear disregard of the values and aims of the CoE", including occupying other member states, sponsoring separatist movements, and ignoring judgements of the European Court of Human Rights. In February 2022, 42 out of 47 member states voted for Russia to be suspended from membership in reaction to the 2022 Russian invasion of Ukraine. On 15 March, Russia formally announced its withdrawal from the organization, seeking to preempt a vote on expulsion; its membership was due to terminate on 31 December 2022. However, on 16 March the Committee of Ministers voted to expel Russia from the council with immediate effect.  On January 17, 2023, Vladimir Putin submitted to the State Duma a draft law on the termination of international treaties of the Council of Europe with respect to Russia.

Accession
In 1989, the Parliamentary Assembly of the Council of Europe (PACE) granted the Supreme Soviet of the Soviet Union a special guest status, granting Soviet parliamentarians the right to attend but not vote. After the dissolution of the Soviet Union, President Boris Yeltsin worked for the Russian Federation to join the Council of Europe. In 1992, the Committee of Ministers, the Council of Europe's executive, expressed support for eventual Russian membership when it met the requirements laid out in the Statute of the Council of Europe, namely pluralist parliamentary democracy and protection of rule of law and human rights. In 1994, a commission appointed by PACE determined that Russia was unfit for membership, citing deficits in Russia's legal order, especially in the areas of "constitutional rights, freedom of movement, national minorities, political and religious freedoms, the death penalty, military conscripts, secret surveillance, and places of detention".

PACE suspended Russia's membership application later that year in response to the First Chechen War, citing "the indiscriminate and disproportionate use of force by the Russian military", which it declared to be contrary to the Council of Europe's values. Russia signed the European Convention on Human Rights in 1996 and ratified it two years later. Russia joined the Council of Europe in 1996. At the time, Irina Busygina and Jeffrey Kahn wrote, "No serious observer believed that Russia met the criteria for membership". Relaxation of standards also characterized the accession of other countries including Ukraine, Romania, and Croatia. British delegate David Atkinson argued that Russia could be suspended if it did not meet its obligations.

Effect of membership

The argument for admitting Russia to the Council of Europe rested on the belief that membership would lead it to change its behavior in line with the Council of Europe's fundamental values. Initially there was great optimism, and Russia changed several laws to bring them into compliance with Council of Europe requirements, at least on paper. The effect of membership on Russia's human rights record has been judged successful in some individual cases brought to the European Court of Human Rights (ECtHR), when they are low-profile and not politically sensitive. By 2008, more than 25 percent of ECtHR cases concerned Russia, clogging the court's docket and creating a backlog. The flood of cases, many of which resulted in judgements against Russia, revealed systematic flaws in Russian protection of human rights. Although in some cases Russia made reforms to address the underlying issues, it was more common for the state to simply pay the complainants without any reform.

After 2000, the country experienced autocratization and a decline in freedoms, accompanied with increasing distance from the Council of Europe. Russia has carried out wars of aggression against other Council of Europe member states: in 2008, it invaded Georgia; in 2014, it launched conflicts in parts of Ukraine and annexed Crimea; and in 2022 it began a full-scale invasion of Ukraine.

Reputational cost
In a 2019 paper, international law scholars Kanstantsin Dzehtsiarou and Donal K Coffey cited Russia as one of the Council of Europe member states that show "persistent and clear disregard of the values and aims of the CoE". Dzehtsiarou and Coffey concluded that ECtHR judgements are not effective in bringing about structural change if there is no political will to implement them in the member state. The fact that Russia remained a full member of the Council of Europe while occupying other member states, ignoring ECtHR judgements, and sponsoring separatist movements had the potential to erode the credibility of the institution.

Suspensions and expulsion
Russia was suspended from voting rights in PACE from 2000 to 2001 because of the Second Chechen War. After the Russian annexation of Crimea and Russian invasion of the Donbas region of Ukraine, PACE condemned Russia's war of aggression and demanded its withdrawal in a nonbinding resolution. The assembly also suspended some of Russia's voting privileges. To avoid the potential of exclusion, Russia's delegation did not attend in 2016, 2017, or 2018; Russia also withheld its membership dues. In 2019, the suspension was dropped. Many human rights activists in Russia argued against Russia's expulsion in order to preserve the right of Russians to petition the ECtHR in response to government abuses.  The Secretary General of the Council of Europe told Financial Times that a Russian expulsion "will be a negative development for Europe, because we will have a Europe without Russia. It would be a big step back for Europe".

On 25 February 2022, a day after Russia invaded Ukraine, 42 of 47 member states voted to immediately suspend Russia's voting privileges in both PACE and the Committee of Ministers. The only country besides Russia to vote against was Armenia; Serbia and Azerbaijan did not attend and Turkey abstained. According to Dzehtsiarou, the large-scale invasion of one Council of Europe state by another was unprecedented and the vote against Russia was a sign that almost all member states no longer want Russia in the Council of Europe. The only other member state to leave the institution was Greece, in 1969, as a result of the Greek case (Greece later rejoined after a democratic transition). On 15 March, hours before a vote on its expulsion, Russia filed a notice of voluntary withdrawal from the Council of Europe; its membership was due to terminate on 31 December 2022. On 16 March, the Committee of Ministers decided to expel Russia with immediate effect.

After Russia was suspended from the Council of Europe in the wake of its 2022 invasion of Ukraine, and subsequently announced its intention to withdraw from the organization, former President (2008–2012) and Prime Minister (2012–2020) Dmitry Medvedev endorsed restoring death penalty in Russia.

References

Foreign relations of Russia
Council of Europe
Human rights in Russia